The Yellabinna Regional Reserve is a protected area in the Australian  state of South Australia located about  north of Ceduna. To the west it borders Nullarbor Regional Reserve, to the south Yumbarra Conservation Park and Pureba Conservation Park. In the northwestern Section the 5,030 km2 Yellabinna Wilderness Protection Area (YWPA) is almost entirely surrounded by the Regional Reserve. The northern border in the western half of the reserve is formed by the Trans-Australian Railway.

The arid landscape is characterised by red sand dunes. The wildlife is adapted to the dry climate. Typical species are scarlet-chested parrots, Major Mitchell's cockatoos, thorny devils, sandhill dunnarts and malleefowls. The reserve is on the outside of the dingo fence, which borders it in the east. Therefore, it is situated in the area where dingoes are tolerated.

The regional reserve is classified as an IUCN Category VI protected area.

See also
 Protected areas of South Australia
 Regional reserves of South Australia
 Regional Reserve (Australia)
 Yellabinna, South Australia

References

External links
Yellabinna Regional Reserve webpage
Entry for Yellabinna Regional Reserve on protected planet

Regional reserves of South Australia
Protected areas established in 1990
1990 establishments in Australia
Great Victoria Desert